Vladimir Aleksandrovich Astapovsky (July 16, 1946 – April 12, 2012) was a Soviet football player. He was born in Bryansk.

Honours
 Soviet Top League winner: 1970.
 Olympic bronze: 1976.
 Soviet Goalkeeper of the Year: 1976.
 Soviet Footballer of the Year: 1976.
 Medal "For Distinguished Labour": 1977.
 Honored Master of Sports of Russia: 2003.

International career
Astapovsky made his debut for USSR national football team on November 29, 1975 in a friendly against Romania. He played in the qualifiers for the 1978 FIFA World Cup, but his nation did not qualify.

References

External links
 Profile on rusteam.permian.ru

1946 births
2012 deaths
Sportspeople from Bryansk
Soviet footballers
Soviet Union international footballers
Soviet Top League players
PFC CSKA Moscow players
Olympic footballers of the Soviet Union
Olympic bronze medalists for the Soviet Union
Footballers at the 1976 Summer Olympics
Olympic medalists in football
FC SKA-Khabarovsk players
Medalists at the 1976 Summer Olympics
Association football goalkeepers
Neftçi PFK players